An effigy is a representation of a person.

Effigy may also refer to:

 Effigy (group), An Australian indie-pop group in the 1990s
 Effigy (DC Comics), a DC Comics supervillain
 Effigy (Dungeons & Dragons), an undead creature in Dungeons & Dragons
 Effigy (Marvel Comics), a fictional character in the Marvel Comics universe
 Effigy (album), a 2003 album by Nomy Lamm
 "Effigy", a song by Creedence Clearwater Revival from the album Willy and the Poor Boys
 "Effigy", a song by Andrew Bird from the album Noble Beast
 "Effigy", a song by Converge from the album Axe to Fall
 "Effigy", a song by Seether from Holding onto Strings Better Left to Fray
 "Effigy (I'm Not an)", a song by Ministry from With Sympathy
 "Effigy", a song by Clutch from the album Transnational Speedway League
 Lady Effigie, a character in the 1966 film Munster, Go Home!, Herman Munster's adopted Aunt
 The Effigies, a punk rock band from Chicago, Illinois
 Tomb effigy, a sculpted figure on a tomb monument depicting the deceased

See also
Efígie da República